The Tamil Filmfare Best Female Playback Award is given by  Filmfare magazine as part of its annual Filmfare Awards for Tamil films. The first Tamil award was given in 2006. However, since 1997 till 2005, a common award for playback was available for both male and female singers of all the four South Indian languages.

Superlatives & Multiple wins

Multiple nominations

7 nominations :Shreya Ghoshal 
6 nominations :Chinmayi, Swetha Mohan 
4 nominations :Saindhavi 
3 nominations :Shakthisree Gopalan, Neeti Mohan, Suchitra, Shashaa Tirupati, Dhee 
2 nominations :Sadhana Sargam, Andrea Jeremiah, Shruthi Haasan, Bombay Jayashri, Vandana Srinivasan, K.S.Chithra, Jonita Gandhi

Winners

Nominations
The nominees were announced publicly only from 2009. The list along with winners:

2000s
2009: Deepa Miriam – "Kangal Irandal" from Subramaniyapuram
 Bombay Jayashri – "Yaaro Manadhile" from Dhaam Dhoom
 Sadhana Sargam – "Mukundha Mukundha" from Dasavathaaram
 Shreya Ghoshal – "Then Then" from Kuruvi
 Shweta Mohan – "Kanden Kanden" from Pirivom Santhippom

2009: Chinmayi – "Vaarayo Vaarayo"  from Aadhavan
 Harini – "Hasile Fisile" from Aadhavan
 Rita – "Allegra" from Kanthasamy
 Shreya Ghoshal – "Oru Vetkam" from Pasanga
 Suchitra – "Oru Chinna Thamarai" from Vettaikaran

2010s
2010: Shreya Ghoshal – "Un Perai Sollum" from Angaadi Theru
 Andrea Jeremiah and Aishwarya Dhanush – "Unmele Aasadhan" from Aayirathil Oruvan
 Chinmayi – "Kilimanjaro" from Enthiran
 Saindhavi – "Adadaa Mazhadaa" from Paiyaa
 Suchitra – "En Idhayam" from Singam

2011: Chinmayi – "Sara Sara" from Vaagai Sooda Vaa
 Shweta Mohan – "Nee Koorinaal" from 180
 Madhushree – "Un Perai Theriyaadhu" from Engaeyum Eppothum
 Saindhavi – "Vizhigalil Oru" from Deiva Thirumagal
 Neha Bhasin – "Poraane Poraane" from Vaagai Sooda Vaa

2012: NSK Ramya – "Satru Munbu" from Neethaane En Ponvasantham
 Shruthi Haasan – "Kannazhagaa" from 3
 Andrea Jeremiah – "Googel Google" from Thuppakki
 Shreya Ghoshal – "Sollitaley" from Kumki
 Chinmayi – "Asku Laska" from Nanban

2013: Shakthisree Gopalan – "Nenjukulle" from Kadal
 Saindhavi – "Yaar Indha Saalai Oram" from Thalaivaa
 Saindhavi – "Yaaro Ivan" from Udhayam NH4
 Suchitra – "Ailasa Ailasa" from Vanakkam Chennai
 Vandana Srinivasan – "Avatha Paiyya" from Paradesi

2014: Uthara Unnikrishnan – "Azhagu" from Saivam
 Bhavya Pandit – "Ovvondrai Thirudigarai" from Jeeva
 Shakthisree Gopalan and Dhee – "Naan Nee" from Madras
 Shweta Mohan – "Yaarumilla" from Kaaviya Thalaivan
 Vandana Srinivasan – "Unnai Ippa" from Kayal

2015: Shweta Mohan – "Enna Solla" from Thanga Magan
 Kharesma Ravichandran – "Kadhal Cricket" from Thani Oruvan
 Neeti Mohan – "Neeyum Naanum" from Naanum Rowdy Dhaan
 Shreya Ghoshal – "Pookkale Sattru" from I
 Shruti Haasan – "Yeandi Yeandi" from Puli

2016: Shweta Mohan – "Maya Nadhi" from Kabali
 Chinmayi – "Naan Un" from 24
 K. S. Chithra – "Konji Pesida Venam" from Sethupathi
 Mahalakshmi Iyer – "Un Maele Oru Kannu" from Rajini Murugan
 Neeti Mohan – "Chella Kutti" from Theri

2017: Shashaa Tirupati – "Vaan Varuvaan" from Kaatru Veliyidai
 Luksimi Sivaneswaralingam – "Senthoora" from Bogan
 Neeti Mohan – "Idhayame" from Velaikkaran
 Shreya Ghoshal – "Neethane" from Mersal
 Shweta Mohan – "Macho" from Mersal

2018: Chinmayi – "Kaathale Kathale" from 96
 Dhee – "Rowdy Baby" from Maari 2
Jonita Gandhi – "Omg Ponnu" from Sarkar
 Shakthisree Gopalan – "Bhoomi Bhoomi" from Chekka Chivantha Vaanam
Shashaa Tirupati – "Endhira Logathu" from 2.0

2020s
2020-2021: Dhee – "Kaattu Payale" from Soorarai Pottru
 Jonita Gandhi – "Chellama" from Doctor
 K. S. Chithra – "Thangam Thangam" from Annaatthe
 Kidakkuzhi Mariyammal – "Kandaa Vara Sollunga" from Karnan 
 Shashaa Tirupati – "Bodhai Kaname" from Oh Manapenne!

See also

 List of music awards honoring women
 Filmfare Award for Best Female Playback Singer – Telugu
 Filmfare Award for Best Female Playback Singer – Kannada
 Filmfare Award for Best Female Playback Singer – Malayalam

Notes

References

External links
 55th Filmfare Awards South Winners
 53rd Filmfare Awards South Winners

Female Playback
Music awards honoring women